The following species in the genus Silene are recognised by Plants of the World Online: 

Silene abietum Font Quer & Maire
Silene acaulis (L.) Jacq. – moss campion
Silene acutidentata Bondarenko & Vved.
Silene acutifolia Link ex Rohrb.
Silene adelphiae Runemark
Silene adenocalyx F.N.Williams
Silene adenopetala Raikova
Silene adenophora (Schischk.) Czerep.
Silene aegaea Oxelman
Silene aegyptiaca (L.) L.f.
Silene aellenii Sennen
Silene aeoniopsis Bornm.
Silene aethiopica Burm.f.
Silene affghanica Rohrb.
Silene ajanensis (Regel & Tiling) Vorosch.
Silene akaisialpina (T.Yamaz.) H.Ohashi, Tateishi & H.Nakai
Silene akinfijewii Schmalh.
Silene akiyamae Rajbh. & Mits.Suzuki
Silene akmaniana Ekim & Çelik
Silene alaschanica (Maxim.) Bocquet
Silene albescens Boiss.
Silene alexandri Hillebr. – Kamalo Gulch catchfly
Silene alexandrina (Asch.) Danin
Silene alexeji Kolak.
Silene almolae J.Gay
Silene alpestris Willd. ex Nyman - alpine catch-fly
Silene alpicola Schischk.
Silene altaica Pers.
Silene ammophila Boiss. & Heldr.
Silene amoena L.
Silene ampullata Boiss.
Silene anatolica Melzh. & A.Baytop
Silene andarabica Podlech
Silene andicola Gillies ex Hook. & Arn.
Silene andryalifolia Pomel
Silene antarctica (Kuntze) Pedersen
Silene antirrhina L. – sleepy catchfly
Silene antri-jovis Greuter & Burdet
Silene aomorensis M.Mizush.
Silene aperta Greene – naked catchfly
Silene apetala Willd.
Silene aprica Turcz. ex Fisch. & C.A.Mey.
Silene arabica Boiss.
Silene araratica Schischk.
Silene arenarioides Desf.
Silene arenosa K.Koch
Silene argaea Fisch. & C.A.Mey.
Silene argentea Ledeb.
Silene argentina (Pax) Bocquet
Silene argentinensis Hauman
Silene arghireica Vals.
Silene argillosa Munby
Silene arguta Fenzl
Silene aristidis Pomel
Silene armena Boiss. – Sweet William catchfly
Silene arsuzensis Özbek & Uzunh.
Silene articulata Viv.
Silene asclepiadea Franch.
Silene asirensis D.F.Chamb. & Collen.
Silene assyriaca Hausskn. & Bornm. ex Lazkov
Silene astartes Blanche ex Boiss.
Silene astrachanicum (Pacz.) Takht.
Silene atlantica Coss. & Durieu
Silene atocioides Boiss.
Silene atrocastanea Diels
Silene atsaensis (C.Marquand) Bocquet
Silene aucheriana Boiss.
Silene auriculata Sm.
Silene auriculifolia Pomel
Silene austroiranica Rech.f., Aellen & Esfand.
Silene avromana Boiss. & Hausskn.
Silene ayachica Humbert
Silene aydosensis K.Yildiz & Erik
Silene azirensis Coode & Cullen
Silene baccifera (L.) Durande
Silene badachschanica Ovcz.
Silene badaroi Breistr.
Silene balansae Boiss.
Silene baldshuanica B.Fedtsch.
Silene bamianica Gilli
Silene banksia (Meerb.) Mabb.
Silene baranovii Ovcz. & Kurbanb.
Silene barbara Humbert & Maire
Silene barbeyana Heldr. ex Boiss.
Silene barrattei Murb.
Silene baschkirorum Janisch.
Silene batangensis H.Limpr.
Silene bayburtensis Hamzaoglu & Aksoy
Silene bazardzica ourková
Silene beguinotii Vals.
Silene behboudiana Rech.f. & Esfand.
Silene behen L.
Silene bellidifolia Juss. ex Jacq.
Silene bernardina S.Watson – Palmer's catchfly
Silene bersieri Bocquet
Silene berthelotiana Webb ex Christ
Silene betpakdalensis Bajtenov
Silene biafrae Hook.f.
Silene biappendiculata Ehrh. ex Rohrb.
Silene bilgilii E.Dogan & H.Duman
Silene bilingua W.W.Sm.
Silene birandiana Ekim
Silene birgittae Bocquet
Silene bitlisensis Tugay & Ertugrul
Silene bobrovii Schischk.
Silene bolanthoides Quézel, Contandr. & Pamukç.
Silene borderei Jord.
Silene boryi Boiss.
Silene borysthenica (Gruner) Walters
Silene bourgaei Webb ex Christ
Silene boyd-klineana Halda, P.Gustafson & Vostrák
Silene brahuica Boiss.
Silene breviauriculata Ghaz.
Silene brevicalyx Hartvig & Å.Strid
Silene brevicaulis Boiss.
Silene brevistaminea Gilli
Silene bridgesii Rohrb. – Bridges' catchfly
Silene bucharica Popov
Silene bungei Bocquet
Silene bupleuroides L.
Silene burchellii Otth
Silene burmanica Collett & Hemsl.
Silene cabulica Bornm.
Silene caesarea Boiss. & Balansa
Silene caesia Sm.
Silene caespitella F.N.Williams
Silene calabra Brullo, Scelsi & Spamp.
Silene caliacrae Jordanov & Panov
Silene cambessedesii Boiss. & Reut.
Silene campanula Pers.
Silene campanulata S.Watson – Red Mountain catchfly
Silene canariensis Spreng.
Silene cancellata (Jacquem. ex Edgew. & Hook.f.) Majumdar
Silene capillipes Boiss. & Heldr.
Silene capitata Kom.
Silene capitellata Boiss.
Silene cappadocica Boiss. & Heldr.
Silene caramanica Boiss. & Heldr.
Silene cardiopetala Franch.
Silene cariensis Boiss.
Silene caroli-henrici Melzh.
Silene caroliniana Walter – wild pink
Silene cartilaginea Hub.-Mor.
Silene caryophylloides (Poir.) Otth
Silene cashmeriana (Royle ex Benth.) Majumdar
Silene catholica (L.) W.T.Aiton
Silene cattariniana Ferrarini & Cecchi
Silene caucasica (Bunge) Boiss.
Silene caudata Ovcz.
Silene cephalantha Boiss.
Silene cephallenia Heldr.
Silene chaetodonta Boiss.
Silene chaetodontoidea Parsa
Silene chalcedonica (L.) E.H.L.Krause – flower of Bristol, Maltese cross, meadow campion
Silene chamarensis Turcz.
Silene chersonensis (Zapal.) Kleopow
Silene chihuahuensis Standl.
Silene chilensis (Naudin) Bocquet
Silene chirensis A.Rich.
Silene chlorantha (Willd.) Ehrh.
Silene chlorifolia Sm.
Silene chodatii Bocquet
Silene choruhensis Hamzaoglu
Silene choulettii Coss.
Silene chubutensis (Speg.) Bocquet
Silene chungtienensis W.W.Sm.
Silene chustupica Nersesian
Silene ciliata Pourr.
Silene cinerea Desf.
Silene cintrana Rothm.
Silene circumcarmanica F.Jafari, Gholipour, Mirtadz. & Pourmirzaei
Silene cirpicii K.Yildiz & Dadandi
Silene cirtensis Pomel
Silene citrina Boiss.
Silene claryi Batt.
Silene claviformis Litv.
Silene cobalticola P.A.Duvign. & Plancke
Silene cognata (Maxim.) H.Ohashi & H.Nakai
Silene colorata Poir.
Silene colpophylla Wrigley
Silene commelinifolia Boiss.
Silene confertiflora Chowdhuri
Silene congesta Sm.
Silene conglomeratica Melzh.
Silene conica L. – sand catchfly
Silene coniflora Nees ex Otth
Silene conoidea L. – weed silene
Silene cordifolia All.
Silene coronaria (L.) Clairv. – rose campion
Silene corrugata Ball
Silene corylina D.F.Chamb. & Collen.
Silene coutinhoi Rothm. & P.Silva
Silene crassifolia L.
Silene crassipes Fenzl
Silene crassiuscula Brullo, C.Brullo, Cambria, Bacch., Giusso & Ilardi
Silene cretacea Fisch. ex Spreng.
Silene cretica L.
Silene crispans Litv.
Silene crispata Steven
Silene cryptoneura Stapf
Silene cryptopetala Hillebr.
Silene csereii Baumg.
Silene cuatrecasasii Pau & Font Quer
Silene cuspidata Pedersen
Silene cyrenaica Maire & Weiller
Silene cyri Schischk.
Silene cythnia (Halácsy) Walters
Silene czopandagensis Bondarenko
Silene daenensis Melzh.
Silene dagestanica Rupr.
Silene damascena Boiss. & Gaill.
Silene damboldtiana Greuter & Melzh.
Silene danaensis Danin
Silene danielii Hadac
Silene davidii (Franch.) Oxelman & Lidén
Silene davidlongii Rajbh. & Mits.Suzuki
Silene dawoensis H.Limpr.
Silene degeneri Sherff
Silene delavayi Franch.
Silene delicatula Boiss.
Silene demawendica Bornm.
Silene demirizii K.Yildiz & Çirpici
Silene denizliensis Aytaç
Silene densiflora d'Urv.
Silene dentipetala H.Chuang
Silene depressa M.Bieb.
Silene dianthoides Pers.
Silene dichotoma Ehrh. – forked catchfly
Silene diclinis (Lag.) M.Laínz
Silene dieterlei Podlech
Silene dinarica Spreng.
Silene dioica (L.) Clairv. – red campion
Silene dirphya Greuter & Burdet
Silene dissecta Litard. & Maire
Silene disticha Willd.
Silene divaricata/Lychnis divaricata Clemente
Silene diversifolia Otth
Silene doganii A.Duran & Menemen
Silene donetzica Kleopow
Silene douglasii Hook. – Douglas' catchfly
Silene drummondii Hook.
Silene dschuparensis Bornm.
Silene dumanii Kandemir, G.E.Genç & I.Genç
Silene dumetosa C.L.Tang
Silene duralii Bagci
Silene dyris Maire
Silene echegarayi (Hieron.) Bocquet
Silene echinata Otth
Silene echinosperma Boiss. & Heldr.
Silene echinospermoides Hub.-Mor.
Silene edgeworthii Bocquet
Silene elisabethae Jan
Silene elymaitica Bornm.
Silene eminentis Özçelik
Silene erciyesdaghensis – discovered on Mount Erciyes and named after it
Silene eremitica Boiss.
Silene eriocalycina Boiss.
Silene ermenekensis Vural & Kit Tan
Silene ertekinii Aydin & Oxelman
Silene erubescens (Schischk.) Czerep.
Silene erysimifolia Stapf
Silene esquamata W.W.Sm.
Silene eugeniae Kleopow
Silene euxina (Rupr.) Hand.-Mazz.
Silene eviscosa Bondarenko & Vved.
Silene exaltata Friv.
Silene fabaria (L.) Coyte
Silene fabarioides Hausskn.
Silene falcata Sm.
Silene falconeriana Royle ex Benth.
Silene farsistanica Melzh.
Silene favargeri Bocquet
Silene fedtschenkoana Preobr.
Silene fedtschenkoi Bondarenko & Vved.
Silene fenzlii Boiss. & Balansa
Silene ferdowsii Joharchi, Nejati & F.Ghahrem.
Silene ferganica Preobr.
Silene fernandezii Jeanm.
Silene fetissovii Lazkov
Silene fetleri D.K.Pavlova
Silene filifolia (Dusén) Bocquet
Silene filipetala Litard. & Maire
Silene firma Siebold & Zucc.
Silene fissicalyx Bocquet & Chater
Silene fissipetala Turcz.
Silene flaccida Pau
Silene flammulifolia Steud. ex A.Rich.
Silene flavescens Waldst. & Kit.
Silene flos-cuculi (L.) Greuter & Burdet – ragged robin
Silene flos-jovis (L.) Greuter & Burdet – flower-of-Jove
Silene foetida Link ex Spreng.
Silene foliosa Maxim.
Silene fraudatrix Meikle – North Cyprus catchfly
Silene frivaldskyana Hampe
Silene froedinii Rech.f.
Silene fruticosa L.
Silene fruticulosa M.Bieb.
Silene fuscata Link ex Brot.
Silene gaditana Talavera & Bocquet
Silene galataea Boiss.
Silene gallica L. – small-flowered catchfly
Silene gallinyi Heuff. ex Rchb.
Silene gangotriana Pusalkar, D.K.Singh & Lakshmin.
Silene gasimailikensis B.Fedtsch.
Silene gaubae Bornm. & Gauba
Silene gavrilovii (Krasn.) Popov
Silene gazulensis A.Galán, J.E.Cortés, Vicente Orell. & Mor.Alonso
Silene gebleriana Schrenk
Silene gemmata Meikle
Silene genovevae Bocquet
Silene georgievskyi Lazkov
Silene germana J.Gay
Silene gertraudiae Melzh.
Silene gevasica Hamzaoglu
Silene ghahremaninejadii Hoseini & Assadi
Silene ghiarensis Batt.
Silene gigantea L.
Silene gillettii (Turrill) M.G.Gilbert
Silene glaberrima Faure & Maire
Silene glabrescens Coss.
Silene goksuensis Budak, Hamzaoglu & Koç
Silene goniocaula Boiss.
Silene gonosperma (Rupr.) Bocquet
Silene goulimyi Turrill
Silene gracilenta H.Chuang
Silene gracilicaulis C.L.Tang
Silene gracilis DC.
Silene gracillima Rohrb.
Silene graeca Boiss. & Spruner
Silene graminifolia Otth
Silene grandiflora Franch.
Silene grayi S.Watson – Gray's catchfly
Silene × grecescui Gusul.
Silene greenei (S.Watson ex B.L.Rob.) Howell
Silene greywilsonii Rajbh. & Mits.Suzuki
Silene grisea Boiss.
Silene grisebachii (Davidov) Pirker & Greuter
Silene grossheimii Schischk.
Silene gubanovii Lazkov
Silene guerbuezii Özçelik
Silene guichardii Chevassut & Quézel
Silene guinetii Quézel
Silene guntensis (B.Fedtsch.) B.Fedtsch. ex Schischk.
Silene gynodioica Ghaz.
Silene habaensis H.Chuang
Silene × hampeana Meusel & K.Werner
Silene hamzaoglui Budak
Silene haradjianii Chowdhuri
Silene haumanii Bocquet
Silene haussknechtii Heldr. ex Hausskn.
Silene hawaiiensis Sherff – Hawaii catchfly
Silene hayekiana Hand.-Mazz. & Janch.
Silene heldreichii Boiss.
Silene helleboriflora Exell & Bocquet
Silene hellmannii Claus
Silene helmandica Podlech
Silene herbilegorum (Bocquet) Lidén & Oxelman
Silene heterodonta F.N.Williams
Silene heuffelii Soó
Silene hicesiae Brullo & Signor.
Silene hidaka-alpina (Miyabe & Tatew.) Ohwi & H.Ohashi
Silene hideakiohbae Rajbh. & Mits.Suzuki
Silene hifacensis Rouy ex Willk.
Silene himalayensis (Rohrb.) Majumdar
Silene hirticalyx Boiss. & Hausskn.
Silene hitchguirei Bocquet
Silene hoefftiana Fisch. & C.A.Mey.
Silene holosteifolia Bocquet & Chater
Silene holzmannii Heldr. ex Boiss.
Silene hookeri Nutt. – Hooker's silene
Silene horvati – Horvats's catchfly
Silene huguettiae Bocquet
Silene humilis C.A.Mey.
Silene huochenensis X.M.Pi & X.L.Pan
Silene hupehensis C.L.Tang
Silene hussonii Boiss.
Silene ibosii Emb. & Maire
Silene ichnusae Brullo, De Marco & De Marco f.
Silene ikonnikovii Lazkov
Silene imbricata Desf.
Silene inaperta L.
Silene incisa C.L.Tang
Silene inclinata Hub.-Mor.
Silene incurvifolia Kar. & Kir.
Silene indeprensa Schischk.
Silene indica Roxb. ex Otth
Silene insularis Barbey
Silene integripetala Bory & Chaub.
Silene × intermedia (Lange) Bocquet
Silene intramongolica Lazkov
Silene intricata Post
Silene invisa C.L.Hitchc. & Maguire – red fir catchfly
Silene involucrata (Cham. & Schltdl.) Bocquet
Silene ionica Halácsy
Silene × isabeliae P.P.Ferrer, Ferrando & E.Laguna
Silene isaurica Contandr. & Quézel
Silene ispartensis Ghaz.
Silene italica (L.) Pers. – Italian catchfly
Silene jailensis N.I.Rubtzov
Silene jaxartica Pavlov
Silene jeniseensis Willd.
Silene joerstadii Wendelbo
Silene jugora (F.N.Williams) Majumdar
Silene julaensis Grierson
Silene karaczukuri B.Fedtsch.
Silene karekirii Bocquet
Silene keiskei Miq.
Silene kemahensis Aytaç & Kandemir
Silene kemoniana C.Brullo, Brullo, Giusso, Ilardi & Sciandr.
Silene kermanensis Bornm.
Silene khasiana Rohrb.
Silene kialensis (F.N.Williams) Lidén & Oxelman
Silene kingii (S.Watson) Bocquet
Silene kirgisensis Bajtenov & Nelina
Silene kiusiana (Makino) H.Ohashi & H.Nakai
Silene klokovii Knjaz.
Silene koelzii Rech.f.
Silene konuralpii Firat & K.Yildiz
Silene koreana Kom. – sticky catchfly
Silene korshinskyi Schischk.
Silene koycegizensis Dönmez & Vural
Silene krantzii Stoughton
Silene kremeri Soy.-Will. & Godr.
Silene kubanensis Sommier & Levier
Silene kucukodukii Bagci & Uysal
Silene kudrjaschevii Schischk.
Silene kulabensis B.Fedtsch.
Silene kumaonensis F.N.Williams
Silene kunawarensis Royle ex Benth.
Silene kungessana B.Fedtsch.
Silene kuschakewiczii Regel & Schmalh.
Silene lacera (Steven) Sims
Silene laciniata Cav.
Silene laconica Boiss. & Orph.
Silene ladyginae Lazkov
Silene laevigata Sm. – Troödos catchfly
Silene lagenocalyx Fenzl ex Boiss.
Silene lagunensis C.Sm. ex Link
Silene lamarum C.Y.Wu
Silene lanceolata A.Gray – Kauai catchfly
Silene lanuginosa Bertol.
Silene lasiantha K.Koch
Silene latifolia Poir. – white campion
Silene laxa Boiss. & Kotschy
Silene laxantha Majumdar
Silene lazica Boiss.
Silene legionensis Lag.
Silene lemmonii S.Watson – Lemmon's catchfly
Silene lenkoranica Lazkov
Silene leptoclada Boiss.
Silene leucophylla Boiss.
Silene lhassana (F.N.Williams) Majumdar
Silene libanotica Boiss.
Silene lichiangensis W.W.Sm.
Silene linae Bocquet
Silene linearifolia Otth
Silene lineariloba C.Y.Wu
Silene linearis Decne.
Silene linicola C.C.Gmel. – flaxfield catchfly
Silene linoides Otth
Silene lipskyi Lazkov
Silene lithophila Kar. & Kir.
Silene littorea Brot.
Silene litwinowii Schischk.
Silene lomalasinensis (Engl.) T.Harris & Goyder
Silene longicalycina Kom.
Silene longicarpophora (Kom.) Bocquet
Silene longicilia (Brot.) Otth
Silene longicornuta C.Y.Wu & C.L.Tang
Silene longidens Schischk.
Silene longipetala Vent.
Silene longisepala Nasir
Silene lucida Chowdhuri
Silene luciliae Bocquet
Silene lycaonica Chowdhuri
Silene lychnidea C.A.Mey.
Silene lydia Boiss.
Silene lynesii C.Norman
Silene macrodonta Boiss.
Silene macrosolen Steud. ex A.Rich.
Silene macrostyla Maxim.
Silene maeotica (Klokov) Czerep.
Silene magellanica (Desr.) Bocquet
Silene magenta Yild. & Kiliç
Silene makmeliana Boiss.
Silene mandonii (Rohrb.) Bocquet
Silene manissadjianii Freyn
Silene marcowiczii Schischk.
Silene margaritae Bocquet
Silene marizii Samp.
Silene markamensis L.H.Zhou
Silene marmarica Bég. & A.Vacc.
Silene marmorensis Kruckeb. – Marble Mountain catchfly
Silene marschallii C.A.Mey.
Silene martinolii Bocchieri & Mulas
Silene martyi Emb. & Maire
Silene maurorum Batt. & Pit.
Silene media (Litv.) Kleopow
Silene megalantha Bondarenko & Vved.
Silene mekinensis Coss.
Silene melanantha Franch.
Silene melanopotamica Pedersen
Silene melikjanii Taisumov & Teimurov
Silene melitensis Brullo, C.Brullo, Cambria, Lanfr., S.Lanfr., Miniss., Sciand
Silene mellifera Boiss. & Reut.
Silene melzheimeri Greuter
Silene mentagensis Coss.
Silene menziesii Hook. – Menzies' campion
Silene mesatlantica Maire
Silene meyeri Fenzl ex Boiss. & Buhse
Silene michelsonii Preobr.
Silene micropetala Lag.
Silene microphylla Boiss.
Silene microsperma Fenzl
Silene miksensis Firat & K.Yildiz
Silene minae Strobl
Silene miqueliana (Rohrb.) H.Ohashi & H.Nakai
Silene mirei Chevassut & Quézel
Silene mishudaghensis Gholipour & Parsa Khanghah
Silene modesta Boiss. & Blanche
Silene mollissima (L.) Pers.
Silene monbeigii W.W.Sm.
Silene monerantha F.N.Williams
Silene mongolica Maxim.
Silene montbretiana Boiss.
Silene × montistellensis Ladero
Silene moorcroftiana Benth.
Silene morganae Freyn
Silene morisiana Bég. & Ravenel
Silene morrisonmontana (Hayata) Ohwi & H.Ohashi
Silene muliensis C.Y.Wu
Silene multicaulis Guss.
Silene multiflora (Ehrh.) Pers.
Silene multifurcata C.L.Tang
Silene multinervia S.Watson – manynerve catchfly
Silene mundiana Eckl. & Zeyh.
Silene muradica Schischk.
Silene muschleri Bocquet
Silene muscipula L.
Silene muslimii Pavlov
Silene mutabilis L.
Silene myongcheonensis S.P.Hong & H.K.Moon
Silene nachlingerae A.Tiehm
Silene namlaensis (C.Marquand) Bocquet
Silene nana Kar. & Kir.
Silene nangqenensis C.L.Tang
Silene napuligera Franch.
Silene natalii F.O.Khass. & I.I.Malzev
Silene nefelites C.Brullo, Brullo, Giusso & Ilardi
Silene nemoralis Waldst. & Kit.
Silene nemrutensis K.Yildiz
Silene neoladyginae Lazkov
Silene nepalensis Majumdar
Silene nerimaniae G.E.Genç, Kandemir & I.Genç
Silene nevskii Schischk.
Silene nicaeensis All.
Silene niederi Heldr.
Silene nigrescens (Edgew.) Majumdar
Silene ningxiaensis C.L.Tang
Silene nivalis (Kit.) Rohrb.
Silene nivea (Nutt.) Muhl. ex DC.
Silene nizvana Melzh.
Silene nocteolens Webb & Berthel.
Silene noctiflora L. – night-flowering catchfly
Silene nocturna L.
Silene nodulosa Viv.
Silene notarisii Ces.
Silene novorossica Doweld
Silene nuda (S.Watson) C.L.Hitchc. & Maguire – western fringed catchfly
Silene nummica Vals.
Silene nuncupanda Coode & Cullen
Silene nuratavica Kamelin
Silene nurensis Boiss. & Hausskn.
Silene nutabunda Greuter
Silene nutans L. – Nottingham catchfly
Silene oblanceolata W.W.Sm.
Silene obovata Schischk.
Silene obscura Vorosch.
Silene obtusidentata B.Fedtsch. & Popov
Silene obtusifolia Willd.
Silene occidentalis S.Watson – western catchfly
Silene odontopetala Fenzl
Silene odoratissima Bunge
Silene oenotriae Brullo
Silene olgae (Maxim.) Rohrb.
Silene oligantha Boiss. & Heldr.
Silene oligophylla Melzh.
Silene oligotricha Hub.-Mor.
Silene oliveriana Otth
Silene olympica Boiss.
Silene orbelica Greuter
Silene oreades Boiss. & Heldr.
Silene oregana S.Watson – Oregon silene
Silene oreina Schischk.
Silene oreophila Boiss.
Silene oreosinaica Chowdhuri
Silene orientalimongolica Kozhevn.
Silene orientoalborzensis F.Jafari & Mirtadz.
Silene ornata Aiton
Silene oropediorum Coss.
Silene orphanidis Boiss.
Silene otites (L.) Wibel – Spanish catchfly
Silene otodonta Franch.
Silene ovalifolia (Regel & Schmalh.) Popov
Silene ovata Pursh – ovate-leaved catchfly
Silene oxelmanii Gholipour
Silene oxyodonta Barbey
Silene ozyurtii Aksoy & Hamzaoglu
Silene paeoniensis Bornm. – Paeonian catchfly
Silene paghmanica Gilli
Silene pakistanica Lazkov
Silene paktiensis Podlech & Melzh.
Silene palaestina Boiss.
Silene palinotricha Fenzl ex Boiss.
Silene paphlagonica Bornm.
Silene papillosa Boiss.
Silene paradoxa L.
Silene paranadena Bondarenko & Vved.
Silene parishii S.Watson – Parish's catchfly
Silene parjumanensis Podlech
Silene parnassica Boiss. & Spruner
Silene parrowiana Boiss. & Hausskn.
Silene parryi (S.Watson) C.L.Hitchc. & Maguire
Silene patagonica (Speg.) Bocquet
Silene patula Desf.
Silene peduncularis Boiss.
Silene peloritana C.Brullo, Brullo, Giusso, Miniss. & Sciandr.
Silene pendula L.
Silene pentelica Boiss.
Silene perlmanii W.L.Wagner, D.R.Herbst & Sohmer – cliff-face catchfly
Silene persepolitana Melzh.
Silene persica Boiss.
Silene petersonii Maguire
Silene petrarchae Ferrarini & Cecchi
Silene pharnaceifolia Fenzl
Silene phoenicodonta Franch.
Silene phrygia Boiss.
Silene physalodes Boiss.
Silene physocalycina (Hausskn. & Bornm.) Melzh.
Silene pichiana Ferrarini & Cecchi
Silene pinetorum Boiss. & Heldr.
Silene plankii C.L.Hitchc. & Maguire
Silene platyphylla Franch.
Silene plurifolia Schischk.
Silene plutonica Naudin ex Gay
Silene pogonocalyx (Svent.) Bramwell
Silene polypetala (Walter) Fernald & B.G.Schub. – eastern fringed catchfly
Silene pomelii Batt.
Silene pompeiopolitana J.Gay ex Boiss.
Silene popovii Schischk.
Silene porandica Gilli
Silene portensis L.
Silene praelonga Ovcz.
Silene praemixta Popov
Silene pravitziana Rech.f.
Silene prilepensis Micevski – Prilep catchfly
Silene prilipkoana Schischk.
Silene principis Oxelman & Lidén
Silene procumbens Murray
Silene pruinosa Boiss.
Silene psammitis Link ex Spreng.
Silene pseudaucheriana Melzh.
Silene pseudoatocion Desf.
Silene pseudobehen Boiss.
Silene pseudocashmeriana Bocquet & Chater
Silene pseudofortunei H.P.Tsui & C.L.Tang
Silene pseudoholopetala Lazkov
Silene pseudonurensis Melzh.
Silene × pseudotites Besser ex Rchb.
Silene pseudoverticillata Nasir
Silene pseudovestita Batt.
Silene pterosperma Maxim.
Silene pubicalycina C.Y.Wu
Silene pubicalyx Bondarenko & Vved.
Silene pugionifolia Popov
Silene pungens Boiss.
Silene puranensis (L.H.Zhou) C.Y.Wu & H.Chuang
Silene purii Bocquet & N.P.Saxena
Silene pygmaea Adams
Silene qiyunshanensis X.H.Guo & X.L.Liu
Silene quadriloba Turcz. ex Kar. & Kir.
Silene radicosa Boiss. & Heldr.
Silene ramosissima Desf.
Silene rasvandica Melzh.
Silene rechingeri Bocquet
Silene rectiramea B.L.Rob.
Silene regia Sims – royal catchfly, showy catchfly
Silene reichenbachii Vis.
Silene reinholdii Heldr.
Silene reiseri K.Malý
Silene renzii Melzh.
Silene repens Patrin
Silene requienii Otth
Silene reticulata Desf.
Silene retinervis Ghaz.
Silene reverchonii Batt.
Silene rhiphaena Pau & Font Quer
Silene rhizophora (Muschl.) Bocquet
Silene rhynchocarpa Boiss.
Silene rigens Goldblatt & J.C.Manning
Silene roemeri Friv.
Silene roopiana Kleopow
Silene rosiflora Kingdon-Ward ex W.W.Sm.
Silene rosulata Soy.-Will. & Godr.
Silene rothmaleri P.Silva
Silene rotundifolia Nutt. – roundleaf catchfly
Silene rouyana Batt.
Silene rubella L.
Silene rubricalyx (C.Marquand) Bocquet
Silene ruinarum Popov
Silene ruprechtii Schischk.
Silene sabinosae Pit.
Silene sachalinensis F.Schmidt
Silene salamandra Pamp.
Silene salangensis Melzh.
Silene saldanhensis Goldblatt & J.C.Manning
Silene salicifolia C.L.Tang
Silene salmonacea T.W.Nelson, J.P.Nelson & S.A.Erwin – Klamath Mountain catchfly
Silene salsuginea Hub.-Mor.
Silene samarkandensis Preobr.
Silene samia Melzh. & Christod.
Silene samojedorum (Sambuk) Oxelman
Silene samothracica (Rech.f.) Greuter
Silene sangaria Coode & Cullen
Silene sarawschanica Regel & Schmalh.
Silene sargentii S.Watson – Sargent's catchfly
Silene sartorii Boiss. & Heldr.
Silene saxatilis Sims
Silene saxifraga L.
Silene scabrida Soy.-Will. & Godr.
Silene scabriflora Brot.
Silene scaposa S.Watson
Silene schafta J.G.Gmel. ex Hohen. – autumn catchfly
Silene schimperiana Boiss.
Silene schischkinii (Popov) Vved.
Silene schizopetala Bornm.
Silene schlumbergeri Boiss.
Silene schmuckeri Wettst.
Silene schugnanica B.Fedtsch.
Silene schwarzenbergeri Halácsy
Silene sciaphila Melzh. & Rech.f.
Silene sclerocarpa Dufour
Silene sclerophylla Chowdhuri
Silene scopulorum Franch.
Silene scouleri Hook. – simple campion
Silene secundiflora Otth
Silene sedoides Poir.
Silene seelyi C.V.Morton & J.W.Thomps.
Silene sefidiana (Pau) Greuter & Burdet
Silene semenovii Regel & Herder
Silene sendtneri Boiss.
Silene sennenii Pau
Silene seoulensis Nakai
Silene sericea All.
Silene serpentinicola T.W.Nelson & J.P.Nelson – serpentine Indian pink
Silene sessionis Batt.
Silene setaesperma Majumdar
Silene shahrudensis Rech.f.
Silene shanbashakensis Rech.f.
Silene shehbazii S.A.Ahmad
Silene sibirica (L.) Pers.
Silene siderophila Boiss. & Gaill.
Silene sieberi Fenzl
Silene simsii F.Jafari, Rabeler & Oxelman
Silene sisianica Boiss. & Buhse
Silene skorpilii Velen.
Silene sojakii Melzh.
Silene solenantha Trautv.
Silene songarica (Fisch., C.A.Mey. & Avé-Lall.) Bocquet
Silene sordida Hub.-Mor. & Reese
Silene sorensenis (B.Boivin) Bocquet – Sorensen's catchfly
Silene spaldingii S.Watson – Spalding's silene
Silene spergulifolia (Willd.) M.Bieb.
Silene spinescens Sm.
Silene splendens Boiss.
Silene squamigera Boiss.
Silene staintonii Ghaz.
Silene stapfii Melzh.
Silene stellariifolia Bocquet & Chater
Silene stellata (L.) Coyte – starry campion
Silene stenantha Ovcz.
Silene stenobotrys Boiss. & Hausskn.
Silene stenophylla Ledeb. – narrow-leafed campion
Silene stewartiana Diels
Silene stewartii (Edgew.) Majumdar
Silene stockenii Chater
Silene stracheyi Edgew.
Silene striata Ehrenb. ex Rohrb.
Silene stricta L.
Silene struthioloides A.Gray
Silene stylosa Bunge
Silene suaveolens Kar. & Kir.
Silene subadenophora Ovcz.
Silene subciliata B.L.Rob.
Silene subconica Friv.
Silene subcretacea F.N.Williams
Silene subodhii S.R.Kundu
Silene succulenta Forssk.
Silene suecica
Silene suksdorfii B.L.Rob. – Suksdorf's silene
Silene sumbuliana Deniz & O.D.Dü?en
Silene sunhangii D.G.Zhang, T.Deng & N.Lin
Silene supina M.Bieb.
Silene surculosa Hub.-Mor.
Silene surobica Gilli
Silene sussamyrica Lazkov
Silene sveae Lidén & Oxelman
Silene swertiifolia Boiss.
Silene syngei (Turrill) T.Harris & Goyder
Silene sytnikii Krytzka, Novosad & Protop.
Silene tachtensis Franch.
Silene taimyrensis (Tolm.) Bocquet – Taymyr catchfly
Silene takeshimensis Uyeki & Sakata
Silene taliewii Kleopow
Silene talyschensis Schischk.
Silene tamaranae Bramwell
Silene tatarica (L.) Pers.
Silene tatarinowii Regel
Silene taygetea Halácsy
Silene telavivensis Zohary & Plitmann
Silene tenella C.A.Mey.
Silene tenuiflora Guss.
Silene thurberi S.Watson
Silene thymifolia Sm.
Silene thysanodes Fenzl
Silene tibetica Lidén & Oxelman
Silene tokachiensis Kadota
Silene tolmatchevii Bocquet
Silene tomentella Schischk.
Silene tomentosa Otth
Silene toussidana Quézel
Silene trachyphylla Franch.
Silene tragacantha Fenzl ex Boiss.
Silene trajectorum Kom.
Silene tridentata Desf.
Silene triflora (Bornm.) Bornm.
Silene tuberculata (Ball) Maire & Weiller
Silene tubiformis C.L.Tang
Silene tubulosa Oxelman & Lidén
Silene tunetana Murb.
Silene tunicoides Boiss.
Silene turbinata Guss.
Silene turczaninovii Lazkov
Silene turgida M.Bieb. ex Bunge
Silene turkestanica Regel
Silene undulata Aiton – large-flowered catchfly, gunpowder plant, wild tobacco
Silene ungeri Fenzl
Silene uniflora Roth – sea campion
Silene uralensis (Rupr.) Bocquet
Silene × urbanica Panov
Silene urodonta Bornm.
Silene urvillei Schott ex d'Urv.
Silene vachschii Ovcz.
Silene vagans C.B.Clarke
Silene vallesia L.
Silene valsecchiae Bocchieri
Silene variegata (Desf.) Boiss. & Heldr.
Silene vautierae Bocquet
Silene velcevii Jordanov & Panov
Silene velebitica (Degen) Wrigley
Silene velutina Pourr. ex Loisel.
Silene velutinoides Pomel
Silene ventricosa Adamovic
Silene verecunda S.Watson – San Francisco campion
Silene vidaliana Pau & Font Quer
Silene villosa Forssk.
Silene villosula (Trautv.) V.V.Petrovsky & Elven
Silene violascens (Tolm.) V.V.Petrovsky & Elven
Silene virescens Coss.
Silene virgata Stapf
Silene virginica L. – fire pink
Silene viridiflora L.
Silene viscaria – sticky catchfly
Silene viscariopsis Bornm. – Mariovo catchfly
Silene viscidula Franch.
Silene viscosa (L.) Pers. – white sticky catchfly
Silene vivianii Steud.
Silene volubilitana Braun-Blanq. & Maire
Silene vulgaris (Moench) Garcke – bladder campion
Silene wahlbergella Chowdhuri – northern catchfly
Silene waldsteinii Griseb.
Silene wardii (C.Marquand) Bocquet
Silene weberbaueri (Muschl.) Bocquet
Silene wendelboi Assadi
Silene wilfordii (Regel) H.Ohashi & H.Nakai
Silene williamsii Britton
Silene wolgensis (Hornem.) Otth
Silene wrightii A.Gray
Silene yarmalii Podlech
Silene yemensis Deflers
Silene yetii Bocquet
Silene yildirimlii Dinç
Silene yunnanensis Franch.
Silene zangezura Elenevsky
Silene zawadzkii Herbich
Silene zayuensis L.H.Zhou
Silene zhongbaensis (L.H.Zhou) C.Y.Wu & C.L.Tang
Silene zhoui C.Y.Wu
Silene zuntoreica Zuev

References

Silene